The Baldwin DRS-4-4-1000 was a diesel-electric road switcher produced by the Baldwin Locomotive Works from July, 1948–March, 1950. They had a cast steel frame. The units were configured to normally run with the long hood in the forward position.

Only 9 were built for American railroads, with another 13 manufactured in January and February, 1949 by the Canadian Locomotive Company for the Esquimalt and Nanaimo Railway, the first railroad in Canada to dieselize its locomotive fleet. The DRS-4-4-1000 was (in most cases) visually indistinguishable from its  successor, the RS-12. Only one intact example of the DRS-4-4-1000 is known to exist today (former CPR #8000), and is currently on display in Squamish, British Columbia.

Units produced by Baldwin Locomotive Works (1948–1950)

Units produced by the Canadian Locomotive Company (1949)

References

External links
 Baldwin DRS4-4-1000 & RS-12 Roster
 Preserved Baldwin and Lima Locomotives

B-B locomotives
DRS-4-4-10
CLC locomotives
Diesel-electric locomotives of the United States
Railway locomotives introduced in 1948
Standard gauge locomotives of Canada
Standard gauge locomotives of the United States
Diesel-electric locomotives of Canada